David Cowan Wellington McColl (29 January 1876 – 30 September 1946) was an Australian rules footballer who played with South Melbourne in the Victorian Football League (VFL).

Notes

External links 

1876 births
1946 deaths
VFL/AFL players born outside Australia
Australian rules footballers from Victoria (Australia)
Sydney Swans players